The Research Organization for Aeronautics and Space (ORPA) is one of Research Organizations under the umbrella of the National Research and Innovation Agency (BRIN). It was founded on 1 September 2021 as transformation of National Institute of Aeronautics and Space (LAPAN) after the liquidation of LAPAN into BRIN.

History 
Founded on 1 September 2021 as ORPA, ORPA was transformation of LAPAN after the liquidation of LAPAN into BRIN. As research organization of BRIN, as outlined in Article 175 and Article 176 of Chief of BRIN Decree No. 1/2021, every Research Organizations under BRIN are responsible and answered to Chief of BRIN. It also prescribed that the Research Organizations consisted with Head of Research Organizations, Centers, and Laboratories/Study Groups. For the transitional period, as in Article 210 of Chairman of BRIN Decree No. 1/2021 mandated, the structure of ORPA follows the preceding structure that already established during its time in LAPAN. Due to this, the temporary structure of ORPA largely follows the Chief of LAPAN Decree No. 1/2021.

On 22 September 2021, ORPA constituting document, Chairman of BRIN Decree No. 5/2021, signed by Laksana Tri Handoko and fully published on 8 October 2021. In the constituting document, it is revealed ORPA retained LAPAN old name. LAPAN acronym however, no longer translated as "", it just simply "LAPAN", preserving historical LAPAN name. Thus, the organization name become "ORPA-LAPAN".

On 24 January 2022, part of ORPA-LAPAN, Atmospheric Sciences and Technology Center, transferred to Research Organization for Earth Sciences and Maritime. Aside of the transfer, ORPA-LAPAN structure also slimmed. The change effective from 1 February 2022 and finalized on 1 March 2022 by Chairman of BRIN Decree No. 5/2022. The organization name reverted again to ORPA and removing its "LAPAN" name thru Chairman of BRIN Decree No. 5/2022, backdated from 25 February 2022.

Structure 
The current structure of ORPA is as follows:

 Office of the Head of ORPA
 Research Center for Space 
 Research Center for Aeronautics Technology
 Research Center for Satellite Technology
 Research Center for Rocket Technology
 Research Center for Remote Sensing Technology
Research Groups

List of Heads

References 

Science and technology in Indonesia
2021 establishments in Indonesia
Research institutes in Indonesia
National Research and Innovation Agency
Space program of Indonesia